Nsubuga is a surname. Notable people with the surname include:

Dunstan Nsubuga, Anglican bishop in Uganda
Emmanuel Nsubuga (1914–1991), Ugandan Roman Catholic archbishop
Emmanuel Nsubuga (boxer) (born 1967), Ugandan boxer
Eridard Nsubuga, Anglican bishop in Uganda
Florence Nsubuga (born 1973), Ugandan businesswoman
Frank Nsubuga (born 1980), Ugandan cricketer
Kipoi Tonny Nsubuga (born 1978), Ugandan politician